is a  mountain in the Kawachi region of Osaka Prefecture, Kansai, Japan.  It is near Mount Yamato Katsuragi.

The mountain has lent its name to a series of naval ships and ship classes: the Imperial Japanese Navy's 1877 ironclad Kongō; the 1912 battleship Kongō, the name ship of her class; and the Japan Maritime Self-Defense Force's current destroyer Kongō (DDG-173), also the name ship of her class.

See also
 Mt. Kongō Ropeway
 The 100 Views of Nature in Kansai
 Vajra (金剛)

References

External links
 Chihaya Akasaka Tourism Association

Mountains of Osaka Prefecture
Historic Sites of Japan
Shugendō